Éamonn Wallace (5 September 1959 – 23 November 2022) was an Irish hurler who played for Kilkenny Senior Championship club Erin's Own. He also played for the Kilkenny senior hurling team and was a member of the All-Ireland Championship-winning teams in 1982 and 1983.

Career

Wallace first played hurling with the Erin's Own club in Castlecomer. He enjoyed some success in the underage grades, winning a divisional minor medal in 1975 and a Kilkenny U21HC title in 1978. Wallace subsequently joined the Erin's Own senior team.

Wallace first appeared on the inter-county scene with Kilkenny as a member of the minor team. He was at full-forward when the team beat Cork in the 1977 All-Ireland minor final. Wallace was also part of the under-21 team that was beaten by Tipperary in the 1980 All-Ireland under-21 final. He subsequently joined the senior team and was an unused substitute for Kilkenny's back-to-back National League, Leinster SHC and All-Ireland SHC success in 1982 and 1983.

Death

Wallace died on 23 November 2022, at the age of 63.

Honours

Erin's Own
Kilkenny Under-21 Hurling Championship: 1978

Kilkenny
All-Ireland Senior Hurling Championship: 1982, 1983
Leinster Senior Hurling Championship: 1982, 1983 
National Hurling League: 1981-82, 1982-83
Leinster Under-21 Hurling Championship: 1980
All-Ireland Minor Hurling Championship: 1977
Leinster Minor Hurling Championship: 1977

References

1959 births
2022 deaths
Erin's Own (Kilkenny) hurlers
Kilkenny inter-county hurlers